Hameyran (also Romanized as Ḩameyrān; also known as Ḩameyrān-e ‘Olyā) is a village in Howmeh Rural District, in the Central District of Bandar Lengeh County, Hormozgan Province, Iran. At the 2006 census, its population was 547, in 106 families.

References 

Populated places in Bandar Lengeh County